Quenching The Light (2008) is a PSA-like documentary short film that highlights the persecution of Baháʼís in Iran.

Production
The nine minute documentary was produced by Mithaq Kazimi and features artist Mahmehr Golestaneh's paintings of some of the martyrs of the Baháʼí Faith since 1978, mixed with live video footage of the descendants of the martyrs. The score is composed by Christopher Tressler and Larry Robinson. It was the first documentary addressing the 5 March to 14 May 2008 arrests of the Baháʼí 7.

On the internet, the documentary was first released on Google video and then later on YouTube.

Response
When first uploaded, the video was "flagged" by unknown sources and therefore removed by YouTube. A few months later, in September 2008,  was able to open another account and upload the video.

See also
Iranian Taboo (2011)
Education Under Fire (2011)
''To Light a Candle (2014)

References

External links
Official Website 
Baha'is Online article 
The University of Auckland

Public service announcements
Persecution of Bahá'ís